Nick Vannett (born March 6, 1993) is an American football tight end for the New York Giants of the National Football League (NFL). He played college football at Ohio State. He has also been a member of the Seattle Seahawks, Pittsburgh Steelers, and Denver Broncos.

Early years
Vannett attended Westerville Central High School in Westerville, Ohio, where he graduated in 2011. Vannett played high school football for the Warhawks football team. Vannett achieved all-metro, all-OCC, and all-district selections in recognition of his contributions on the field. Vannett had 47 receptions for 606 yards and eight touchdowns in his senior season. He also played baseball in his youth but did not pursue the sport into college.

College career
Vannett committed to Ohio State on June 30, 2010 and signed his letter of intent on February 2, 2011. Vannett redshirted his first year at Ohio State but played in the next four seasons playing in 53 games totaling 55 receptions, 585 receiving yards, and six receiving touchdowns. Prior to his senior season, Vannett was ranked as the best tight end prospect by ESPN NFL Draft analyst Todd McShay.

Professional career
On December 8, 2015, it was reported that Vannett had accepted his invitation to play in the 2016 Senior Bowl. The week leading up to the Senior Bowl, Vannett impressed many scouts and analysts during practice with many surprised by his blocking skills and receiving ability. He was described as a physically imposing receiver with strong hands and ability to concentrate on contested catches. On January 30, 2016, Vannett caught three passes for 58-yards as a part of Dallas Cowboys' head coach Jason Garrett's North team who lost 16–27 to the South. Vannett was one of 15 tight ends who received an invitation to the NFL Combine and one of 14 players from Ohio state. A back injury, prevented him from completing all of the combine drills, including the 40-yard dash, 20-yard dash, and 10-yard dash. His performance was described by scouts as mediocre as he finished eighth in the bench press and seventh in the vertical. His best performances were in the short shuttle, where he tied for second, and tied South Carolina State's Temarrick Hemingway for first in the 60-yard shuttle. On March 11, 2016, Vannett attended Ohio State's Pro Day, along with Cardale Jones, Pat Elflein, Eli Apple, Marshon Lattimore, Braxton Miller, Michael Thomas, Joey Bosa, Vonn Bell, Darron Lee, Taylor Decker, Ezekiel Elliott, Joshua Perry, Jalin Marshall, Adolphus Washington, and Tyvis Powell. Along with positional drills, Vannett performed the 40-yard dash, 20-yard dash, 20-yard dash, vertical jump (29½"), and broad jump (9'5"). He performed well for the collection of over 122 team representatives and scouts, that included head coaches Mike Mularkey (Titans), Mike Zimmer (Vikings, Mike Tomlin (Steelers), Sean Payton (Saints), and Marvin Lewis (Bengals). At the conclusion of the pre-draft process, Vannett was projected to be a third or fourth round pick by the majority of NFL draft experts and analysts. He was ranked the second best tight end prospect in the draft by Sports Illustrated, the third best tight end prospect by NFLDraftScout.com, and was ranked the fourth best tight end by NFL analyst Mike Mayock.

Seattle Seahawks
On April 29, 2016, Vannett was drafted by the Seattle Seahawks in the third round with the 94th overall pick in the 2016 NFL Draft. He was the third tight end selected, behind Hunter Henry (second round, 35th overall) and Austin Hooper (third round, 81st overall). Head coach Pete Carroll and General Manager John Schneider stated they originally drafted Vannett to be a traditional Y tight end that is more focused on blocking. He became more of a complete tight end after surprising Carroll and Schneider with his receiving skills in off season workouts.

2016
On May 6, 2016, the Seattle Seahawks signed Vannett to a four-year, $3.05 million contract that includes a signing bonus of $656,880.

He entered his first training camp for the Seattle Seahawks competing against Luke Willson, Cooper Helfet, Ronnie Shields, and Brandon Williams,  for the job as the second tight end. Head coach Pete Carroll named Vannett the third tight end to begin the regular season, behind veterans Jimmy Graham and Luke Willson.

During the Seattle Seahawks' second preseason game against the Minnesota Vikings, Vannett caught one pass for a 15-yard gain, but suffered an ankle injury and was unable to finish the 18–11 loss. He missed the last two preseason games and the first four regular season games due to the high ankle sprain. On October 16, 2016, Vannett made his professional regular season debut during the Seahawks' 26–24 victory against the Atlanta Falcons. He played three offensive snaps and two on special teams in his debut. During the game, Seahawks' tight end Luke Willson left after sustaining a knee injury that would require surgery to repair damaged cartilage and stretched ligaments. Vannett moved up on the depth chart to take his place during Willson's absence. On October 30, 2016, Vannett made his first career reception during a 25–20 loss to the New Orleans Saints. He caught his first career reception from a pass from Russell Wilson and gained seven yards before being tackled by Saints cornerback De'Vante Harris. During a Week 10 matchup at the New England Patriots, Vannett made his first career start as the Seahawks defeated the Patriots 31–24. On December 4, 2016, he earned his second career start and caught a season-high two passes for 25 yards as the Seahawks routed the Carolina Panthers 40–7. Vannett was a healthy scratch through Weeks 16–17 and throughout the postseason as head coach Pete Carroll decided to instead play Jimmy Graham, Luke Willson and Brandon Williams. He completed the  season with a total of three receptions for 32 receiving yards and played in nine games with two starts.

2017
Vannett was slated to be the third tight end on the Seahawks' depth chart to begin the  season after Brandon Williams departed for the Indianapolis Colts in free agency.

He played in the Seattle Seahawks' season-opener at the Green Bay Packers and had one reception for a ten-yard gain during the 17–9 loss. On November 26, 2017, Vannett caught two passes for 29 yards and scored his first career touchdown in the Seahawks' 24–13 victory at the San Francisco 49ers. His first career touchdown came in the third quarter as he beat 49ers' linebacker Eli Harold and caught a pass from Russell Wilson to score a 27-yard touchdown to help the Seahawks gain a 13–6 lead. The following week, Vannett started his second game of the season and made a season-high three receptions for 40 receiving yards in a 24–10 victory against the Philadelphia Eagles. He finished the 2017 season with 12	receptions for 124 receiving yards and one receiving touchdown.

2018
In the 2018 season, Vannett recorded 29 receptions for 269 receiving yards and three receiving touchdowns.

Pittsburgh Steelers

On September 24, 2019, Vannett was traded to the Pittsburgh Steelers for a 2020 fifth-round pick. In the 2019 season, Vannett finished with 17 receptions for 166 receiving yards in 16 games, of which he started seven.

Denver Broncos
On April 2, 2020, the Denver Broncos signed Vannett to a two-year, $5.7 million contract. He was released on March 23, 2021.

New Orleans Saints
On March 29, 2021, Vannett signed a three-year contract with the New Orleans Saints. He was placed on injured reserve on September 6, 2021. He was activated on November 11. He was released on November 19 2022.

New York Giants
On November 22, 2022, the New York Giants signed Vannett to their practice squad. On December 3, 2022, he was promoted to the active roster.

Personal life
Vannett graduated from Ohio State with a degree in sport industry.

References

External links
Denver Broncos bio
Seattle Seahawks bio
Ohio State Buckeyes bio

1993 births
Living people
People from Westerville, Ohio
Players of American football from Ohio
American football tight ends
Ohio State Buckeyes football players
Seattle Seahawks players
Pittsburgh Steelers players
Denver Broncos players
New Orleans Saints players
New York Giants players